Van Thomas Barfoot (born Van Thurman Barfoot; June 15, 1919 – March 2, 2012) was a United States Army officer and a recipient of the United States military's highest decoration—the Medal of Honor—for his actions in World War II.

Early life 
Barfoot was born on June 15, 1919, in Edinburg, Mississippi. His grandmother was Choctaw, but Barfoot himself was not an official member of the Choctaw Nation; although he was eligible, his parents never enrolled him.

Military career 
After enlisting in the Army from Carthage, Mississippi, in 1940 and completing his training, Barfoot served with the 1st Infantry Division in Louisiana and Puerto Rico. In December 1941, he was promoted to sergeant and reassigned to the Headquarters Amphibious Force Atlantic Fleet in Quantico, Virginia, where he served until the unit was deactivated in 1943. He next joined the 157th Infantry Regiment, 45th Infantry Division, and was shipped to Europe.

World War II 
During the Italian Campaign Barfoot participated in a series of amphibious landings: the Allied invasion of Sicily in July 1943, the invasion of mainland Italy at Salerno in September 1943, and finally the landings at Anzio in late January 1944. His unit pushed inland from Anzio, and by May 1944 had reached the small town of Carano in southern Italy, in the province of Latina. They set up defensive positions and Barfoot conducted patrols to scout the German lines. When his company was ordered to attack on the morning of 23 May 1944, Barfoot, now a technical sergeant, asked for permission to lead a squad. Because of the patrols he had made, he knew the terrain and the minefield which lay in front of the German position. He advanced alone through the minefield, following ditches and depressions, until he came within a few yards of a machine gun nest on the German flank. After taking out the gun and its crew with a hand grenade, he entered the German trench and advanced on a second machine gun, killing two soldiers and capturing three others. When he reached a third machine gun, the entire crew surrendered to him. Others also surrendered, and Barfoot captured a total of seventeen German soldiers and killed eight.

When the Germans launched an armored counterattack with three Tiger tanks directly against his positions later that day, Barfoot disabled the lead tank with a bazooka, killed part of its crew with his Thompson submachine gun, and turned the German attack. He then advanced into enemy-held territory and destroyed an abandoned German artillery piece. He returned to his own lines and helped two wounded soldiers from his squad to the rear.

Barfoot was subsequently commissioned as a second lieutenant. His division moved into France, and by September 1944 was serving  in the Rhone valley. Lt. Barfoot learned he would be awarded the Medal of Honor and chose to have the presentation ceremony in the field, so that his soldiers could attend. He was formally presented with the medal on September 28, 1944, in Épinal, France, by Lieutenant General Alexander Patch.

Medal of Honor citation
Second Lieutenant Barfoot's official Medal of Honor citation reads:

For conspicuous gallantry and intrepidity at the risk of life above and beyond the call of duty on 23 May 1944, near Carano, Italy. With his platoon heavily engaged during an assault against forces well entrenched on commanding ground, 2d Lt. Barfoot (then Tech. Sgt.) moved off alone upon the enemy left flank. He crawled to the proximity of 1 machinegun nest and made a direct hit on it with a hand grenade, killing 2 and wounding 3 Germans. He continued along the German defense line to another machinegun emplacement, and with his tommygun killed 2 and captured 3 soldiers. Members of another enemy machinegun crew then abandoned their position and gave themselves up to Sgt. Barfoot. Leaving the prisoners for his support squad to pick up, he proceeded to mop up positions in the immediate area, capturing more prisoners and bringing his total count to 17. Later that day, after he had reorganized his men and consolidated the newly captured ground, the enemy launched a fierce armored counterattack directly at his platoon positions. Securing a bazooka, Sgt. Barfoot took up an exposed position directly in front of 3 advancing Mark VI tanks. From a distance of 75 yards his first shot destroyed the track of the leading tank, effectively disabling it, while the other 2 changed direction toward the flank. As the crew of the disabled tank dismounted, Sgt. Barfoot killed 3 of them with his tommygun. He continued onward into enemy terrain and destroyed a recently abandoned German fieldpiece with a demolition charge placed in the breech. While returning to his platoon position, Sgt. Barfoot, though greatly fatigued by his Herculean efforts, assisted 2 of his seriously wounded men 1,700 yards to a position of safety. Sgt. Barfoot's extraordinary heroism, demonstration of magnificent valor, and aggressive determination in the face of pointblank fire are a perpetual inspiration to his fellow soldiers.

Post-World War II 
Having grown up in the strictly segregated south, Barfoot was noted for a comment he made in 1945 regarding African-Americans. Mississippi senator and Ku Klux Klan member Theodore G. Bilbo asked Barfoot if he had much trouble with the African-American soldiers he had served with during the war. To Bilbo's embarrassment, Barfoot responded, "I found out after I did some fighting in this war that the colored boys fight just as good as the white boys...I've changed my idea a lot about colored people since I got into this war and so have a lot of other boys from the south".

Barfoot later served in the Korean War and the Vietnam War, and was awarded a Purple Heart. He reached the rank of colonel before retiring from the Army. 

In retirement, he lived on a farm in Amelia County, Virginia, and later moved to Henrico County, Virginia, near his daughter.

Flagpole dispute
In December 2009, the homeowners' association (HOA) of the Sussex Square, where Barfoot lived in Henrico County, Virginia, ordered him to remove the  flagpole he had erected without their approval and from which he began flying the US flag regularly on Veterans Day. The HOA retained the Coates & Davenport law firm to threaten legal action to enforce their order. This news story first became public when Barfoot's son-in-law reported the story on local talk radio show Elliot in the Morning. Then Fox News and several other news networks picked up the story nationally. The association's bylaws do not forbid flagpoles, but the HOA ruled Barfoot, then aged 90, would not be allowed to use it "for aesthetic reasons." Barfoot contested their order, 
and received support from the public (48,000 people on a Facebook page), from the American Legion, from military groups, and from many politicians, including Virginia Senators Mark Warner and Jim Webb, and White House Press Secretary Robert Gibbs.
Because of the backlash and outrage it received, the association dropped its request on December 8, 2009, ending the controversy within one week.

Death
Barfoot suffered a skull fracture and bleeding in the brain from a fall in front of his home, and died two days later on March 2, 2012, at the age of 92.

Honors
On October 9, 2009, the portion of Mississippi Highway 16 which runs from Carthage through his hometown of Edinburg to the border between Leake and Neshoba counties was named the Van T. Barfoot Medal of Honor Highway. A building at Richmond Veterans Administration Medical Center in Richmond, Virginia, also carries his name.  In May 2022, The Naming Commission recommended that Fort Pickett in Blackstone, Virginia be renamed Fort Barfoot, as part of a larger program of renaming installations named for Confederate Army leaders.

See also

List of Medal of Honor recipients for World War II

References

External links

Medal of Honor Citation for BARFOOT, VAN T.

1919 births
2012 deaths
Military personnel from Mississippi
People from Leake County, Mississippi
Choctaw people
American people of Choctaw descent
United States Army colonels
United States Army personnel of World War II
United States Army Medal of Honor recipients
Recipients of the Silver Star
Recipients of the Legion of Merit
Recipients of the Croix de Guerre (France)
Native American United States military personnel
Accidental deaths in Virginia
Accidental deaths from falls
World War II recipients of the Medal of Honor
United States Army personnel of the Korean War
United States Army personnel of the Vietnam War